Communauté d'agglomération Valence Romans Agglo is the communauté d'agglomération, an intercommunal structure, centred on the cities of Valence and Romans-sur-Isère. It is located in the Drôme department, in the Auvergne-Rhône-Alpes region, southeastern France. It was created in January 2017 by the merger of the former Communauté d'agglomération Valence-Romans Sud Rhône-Alpes and the Communauté de communes de la Raye. Its seat is in Valence. Its area is 940.5 km2. Its population was 223,826 in 2019, of which 64,749 in Valence and 33,098 in Romans-sur-Isère.

Composition
The communauté d'agglomération consists of the following 54 communes:

Alixan
Barbières
Barcelonne
La Baume-Cornillane
La Baume-d'Hostun
Beaumont-lès-Valence
Beauregard-Baret
Beauvallon
Bésayes
Bourg-de-Péage
Bourg-lès-Valence
Chabeuil
Le Chalon
Charpey
Châteaudouble
Châteauneuf-sur-Isère
Châtillon-Saint-Jean
Chatuzange-le-Goubet
Clérieux
Combovin
Crépol
Étoile-sur-Rhône
Eymeux
Génissieux
Geyssans
Granges-les-Beaumont
Hostun
Jaillans
Malissard
Marches
Montéléger
Montélier
Montmeyran
Montmiral
Montvendre
Mours-Saint-Eusèbe
Ourches
Parnans
Peyrins
Peyrus
Portes-lès-Valence
Rochefort-Samson
Romans-sur-Isère
Saint-Bardoux
Saint-Christophe-et-le-Laris
Saint-Laurent-d'Onay
Saint-Marcel-lès-Valence
Saint-Michel-sur-Savasse
Saint-Paul-lès-Romans
Saint-Vincent-la-Commanderie
Triors
Upie
Valence
Valherbasse

References

Agglomeration communities in France
Intercommunalities of Drôme